Podalia amarga is a moth of the family Megalopygidae. It was described by Schaus in 1905.

Description
The wingspan is 22 mm. The forewings are brownish black with the apex broadly and the outer margin narrowly light greyish buff. There is a postmedial whitish line, oblique from costa at two-thirds from the base to vein 5, then deeply dentate to vein 2, and wavy to the inner margin. Separating the dark and light portions is a marginal row of triangular blackish spots, preceded at vein 7 by another spot. The hindwings are smoky black, becoming paler on the outer margin.

References

Moths described in 1905
Megalopygidae